Kattakada is a town in Thiruvananthapuram district of Kerala. It is situated 13km north of Neyyattinkara town, 18km south of Nedumangad town and 20km east of Capital City Thiruvananthapuram.

There is also a Tehsil/Taluk called Kattakada. It comprises 14 revenue villages and 12 Panchayats that surround the town. This taluk was formed in February 2014.

The place name Kattakkada is derived from the Kattaal Devi Temple situated in the town. The word  Kattaal in Malayalam translates to Wild Banyan Tree.

Location
Kattakada is in the eastern part of Thiruvananthapuram District.  It is situated about (22 km) east of Trivandrum, the capital of Kerala. To its north, Nedumangad (18 km) and to south,  Neyyattinkara (14 km)West Vithura(20km). It is a commercial centre and the second biggest market of hill products in the district , after Nedumangad. Neyyar Dam, a tourist spot and the core of Agasthyavanam Wildlife Sanctuary , is only 10 km away from Kattakada at Kallikkad panchyath, towards the east.

The nearest railway stations are Trivandrum Central(18 km), Balaramapuram (10 km) and Neyyattinkara (13 km).

The nearest airport is Thiruvananthapuram International Airport.

See also 

 Mandapathinkadavu
 Neyyattinkara
 Neyyattinkara Railway Station
 Amaravila
 kuttichal
 Kanjiramkulam
 Peyad
 Parassala
 Neyyattinkara Sree Krishna Swami Temple
 Upper cloth revolt
 Thiruvananthapuram
 Municipalities of Kerala

References

External links
 Kattakkada Taluk formed
 ASRTECH Website designing and developing 
 -Kripabag-Complete Printing of Bags, Covers, Bigshoppers...etc
 About Kattakada - In the Local Self Government, Kerala website
 About Kattakada - In the Official Website of Church of South India (CSI) Parish Kattakada
 Kattakada Details on 1city.in
 Map of Thiruvananthapuram District
 About Kattakada
 map

Cities and towns in Thiruvananthapuram district